Podocarpus glomeratus is a species of conifer tree in the family Podocarpaceae. It is native to the montane rainforests of Bolivia, Ecuador, and Peru; between 1800–3600 meters above sea level.

Description
Shrubs or trees up to 20 m. high, with dark brown bark. Leaves are 2–5 cm. long, 2–4 mm. wide; rigid and almost erect, linear-lanceolate or sometimes almost falcate; light grayish green and shiny above, whitish beneath; the base narrowed into a very short petiole; the tip ending in a stiff pungent prickle. Pollen cones up to 6 mm. long, clustered in groups of 6 on slender peduncles 8–12 mm. long. Ovulate cones sessile or on peduncles up to 4 mm. long, with a receptacle 5–6 mm. long. Seed 5 mm. long, subglobose.

Distribution and habitat
Podocarpus glomeratus is found in Bolivia, Ecuador and Peru at an altitudinal range between 1800 and 3600 m (in montane cloud forests). It is an indicator species of primary forest.

See also
Podocarpus National Park

References

glomeratus
Near threatened plants
Trees of Peru
Trees of Ecuador
Trees of Bolivia
Taxonomy articles created by Polbot